Girolamo Colleoni (c. 1500 – after 1555) was an Italian painter of the Renaissance period. He was born in Bergamo, and was active there till 1555, but they left for Spain to work for the Spanish King. He is known for a Marriage of Saint Catherine painted in the style of Titian.

Sources

16th-century Italian painters
Italian male painters
Painters from Bergamo
Italian Renaissance painters
Year of birth uncertain